Technical Center of Internet (acronym – TCI; full name – Closed-End JSC “Technical Center of Internet”) is an organization engaged in technical support of Russian national domains .ru and .рф, as well as .su. The TCI provides service for the Main Register and for the system of registration of national domains, and ensures resilience of the domain addressing of the Russian segment of the Internet. It supports the DNS infrastructure of the Russian segment of the Internet. It also deals with the registrars accredited in the Russian national domains.

The TCI was founded in 2009 by two Russian registries – ANO “The Coordination Center for TLD RU” and the Foundation for Internet Development (FID), which are administrators of the top-level domains .ru, .рф, and .su. Its creation was primarily due to the accelerating growth rate of domain names in domains .ru and .su over the last 2 years and the launch of yet another national domain .РФ.

The TCI concludes service contracts with the registrars and provides them with services on technical support of the Main Register by signing license agreements with the Coordination Center and the FID. As a key element and part of the critical infrastructure of the Russian segment of the Internet, the TCI, supported by its DNS node system, represent an independent entity ensuring equal access of the accredited registrars to the Main Register and the addressing system.

History
The TCI took over the technical support of the Russian national domains, which until recently had been under the Russian Institute for Public Networks’ (RIPN) management. In 1992 the RIPN obtained the  status of a public non-profit organization, whose main objectives were the development of the Internet infrastructure and scientific networks, as well as administration of the domain .su. Delegation of zone .ru . This was followed by the centralized registration of the original list of domains, which consisted of geographical domains and prototypes of the generic domains: com.ru, edu.ru, gov.ru, among others. 

The RIPN turned to the technical support of the Russian segment of the Internet and to the registration of second-level domains in zone .ru, while specially created Steering Group was busy developing the operational provisions for this zone. As an informal association of the Internet providers’ representatives, the Steering Group lacked the legal status.  

The Russian segment of the Internet was evolving very fast. While in 1994 most Internet users were members of scientific and academic networks, in 1998 the Internet was transformed from a hangout of enthusiasts into a business leverage, with all the ensuing consequences. In 1994-1998, the number of Internet users was growing 1.5-2-fold annually. The network boasted of Russian news sites, electronic libraries, search engines, and sites of commercial companies with very different specialization. 

The Steering Group's decision in 1999 to change the scheme of domain registration in zone .ru and creation of the Institute of independent registrars: while remaining the technical center of the  Russian top level national domain .ru the RIPN, transferred its functions of domains registration to independent companies, which were professionally engaged in domain names registration in zone .ru and competed with each other but enjoyed an equal access to the Registry. RU-CENTER, the RIPN’s subsidiary company, became the first registrar in January 2001 by signing a contract with the latter, and in summer “Garant-Park-Telecom” lined up with it.
In 2002, after almost 10 years in existence, the Steering Group disbanded and transferred its functions to an independent non-profit organization the Coordination Center for TLD RU, which was to undertake the development of terms and conditions and organization of all activities in domain .ru already on a professional basis.
For quite a long time the RIPN continued to serve as the technical support of Russian national domains, but by 2009 the Internet in Russia developed into a structure far too big for the RIPN to manage. The Cyrillic domain .РФ was launched, which required technical support. At the time, the ANO Coordination Center for TLD RU and the Foundation for Internet Development (FID) decided to create the Technical Center of Internet as an organization, which would focus entirely on the technical support of the Russian domain space. The RIPN has transferred these functions to the TCI, currently focusing, primarily, on research.

Technological platform 
The TCI is responsible for resilience of the principal resource of the Internet in Russia –that is, national domain zones. The TCI manages the automatic electronic system of registration and administration of domains .ru, .su, .рф and technical means needed to provide primary service for these domains’ DNS servers. The network of DNS nameservers for the allocation of second-level domain zones is located not only in Russia but worldwide. Its operability, by a contract with the TCI, is ensured by the operator of a group of regional Internet Exchange Points (IXes) – MSK-IX, which also connects to the Internet and ensures external network protection of software and hardware complex of the RU/РФ/SU registration system.

Location
The Network of the domain names registration system is a geographically distributed structure. Technologically similar nodes are located in Moscow and St. Petersburg. Each TCI node incorporates an automatic electronic system of registration and administration of domains, primarily DNS and applied nameservers. The Moscow node is located on a technological platform of the Data Processing Center KIAEHOUSE, situated on the territory of the Russian Research Center the “Kurchatov Institute”. The second node is located in St. Petersburg on a technological platform of the data center of the Oktiabrskaya Railway's computer center.

Resilience
The Moscow and St. Petersburg TCI nodes are connected by dual communication channels operating two different fiber optic systems, as well as with fully independent access to the Internet and connection to the Moscow and St. Petersburg IXes. The system's support is ensured by the proper service of systems administrators, as well as by the service of network monitoring operating in 24x7 mode. Each node's equipment is duplicated. Only one node is operable at a time, and the second one is on hot standby. In the event the first node fails the second one steps in. In the event of maintenance works at one of the nodes, functioning proceeds as stated before.

Security and robustness
The Moscow network node facility has a layered security system: the perimeter of the entire territory of the Russian Research Center (the Kurchatov Institute) is guarded, the building is provided with independent round–the-clock security, and the data processing center KIAEHOUSE has a check-point system and 24/7 video surveillance. The data center is equipped with a modern fire-fighting system that uses an inert gas, which is harmless to the equipment in case of activation. The computer center building of the Oktiabrskaya Railway Company represents secured premises of the technological complex, which boasts of robust industrial systems of ensuring equipment resilience. The distributed network of DNS nodes located in 7 Russian federal okrugs, as well as in Europe and America has reiterative redundancy at the hardware and network levels, optimal connectivity of the  DNS nodes with networks of Russian and foreign operators and 24/7 technical support, which ensures resilience of the DNS service for domain zones with fast response and service accessibility at 99.99% from any Internet access point.

Documents
 Technical provisions for interaction with the system of domains registration

Footnotes
Domain SU: from the RIPN to the TCI

Domain name registries